For electoral purpose, each province or municipality (the highest administrative division) of Vietnam is subdivided into electoral units (đơn vị bầu cử) which are further subdivided into voting zones (khu vực bỏ phiếu). The number of electoral divisions varies from election to election and depend on the population of that province or municipality

Since the most recent parliamentary election in 2011, there are 183 electoral units and 89,960 voting zones.

Election
see also Elections in Vietnam

Delegates of the National Assembly of Vietnam are directly elected from population for a five-year term. The National Assembly of Vietnam is unicameral, therefore the number of delegates in an area depends on the population of that area. Currently there are 500 delegates of the National Assembly.

Electoral divisions
Vietnam is a unitary state with 58 provinces and 5 municipalities or centrally-controlled cities. Each province (tỉnh) and municipality (thành phố trực thuộc trung ương) is subdivided into electoral units (đơn vị bầu cử). The number of electoral divisions in each province and municipality depends on the population of that province and municipality. Normally an electoral unit within a province or municipality covers about 2 to 6 district-level subdivisions (đơn vị hành chính cấp huyện; which could be rural districts (huyện), urban districts (quận), provincial cities (thành phố thuộc tỉnh) or towns (thị xã)).

Each electoral unit is further subdivided into voting zones (khu vực bỏ phiếu). Two or three delegates would be elected from each electoral unit.

Since 2011 there are 183 electoral units and 89,960 voting zones.

Municipalities

Hà Nội City
10 electoral units and 30 delegates

Hải Phòng City
3 electoral units and 9 delegates

Đà Nẵng City
2 electoral units and 6 delegates

Hồ Chí Minh City
10 electoral units and 30 delegates

Cần Thơ City
3 electoral units and 7 delegates

Provinces

External links
, list of elected delegates of National Assembly XII
, results of 2011 parliamentary election

Vietnam
Elections in Vietnam
Vietnam politics-related lists